Events from the year 1740 in Scotland.

Incumbents 

 Secretary of State for Scotland: vacant

Law officers 
 Lord Advocate – Charles Erskine
 Solicitor General for Scotland – William Grant of Prestongrange

Judiciary 
 Lord President of the Court of Session – Lord Culloden
 Lord Justice General – Lord Ilay
 Lord Justice Clerk – Lord Milton

Events 
 7 July – Adam Smith sets out from Scotland to take up a scholarship at Balliol College, Oxford.
 Hugh and Robert Tennent take over the Wellpark Brewery, originally known as the Drygate Brewery, in Glasgow.
 General George Wade is succeeded as Commander-in-chief in Scotland by Sir John Cope.
 The 43rd Highland Regiment of Foot (the 'Black Watch') first musters, at Aberfeldy.

Births 
 28 March (bapt.) – James Small, inventor (died 1793)
 15 July – Archibald Hamilton, 9th Duke of Hamilton (died 1819)
 29 October – James Boswell, diarist and biographer of Samuel Johnson (died 1795)
 James Cannon, mathematician and a principal draftsman of the Pennsylvania Constitution of 1776 (died in 1782 in the United States)
 William Davidson, settler, lumberman, shipbuilder and politician in New Brunswick (died 1790 in Canada)
 William Smellie, master printer, naturalist, antiquary, editor and encyclopedist (died 1795)
 Christopher Wyvill, cleric, landowner and political reformer in England (died 1822)

Deaths 
 2 February – John Simson, heterodox theologian (born 1668?)
 22 May – John Boyle, 2nd Earl of Glasgow (born 1688)
 8 September – William Bruce, 8th Earl of Kincardine

The arts
 1 August – the patriotic song "Rule, Britannia!", with words by Scottish-born poet James Thomson, is first performed at Cliveden, the English country home of Frederick, Prince of Wales.

See also 

 Timeline of Scottish history

References 

 
Years of the 18th century in Scotland
Scotland
1740s in Scotland